William of Bavaria-Munich (1435–1435) was a German nobleman. He was the son of Margaret of Cleves and her first husband William III, Duke of Bavaria. He was born after his father’s death and died in infancy, being buried in the church of the Carmelites in Straubing. His elder brother Adolf nominally ruled as duke alongside his uncle Ernest and his cousin Albert III until he died at age seven.

Contemporary sources 

 Bayerisches Hauptstaatsarchiv, Fürstensachen IV, fol. 300–301 = Alfons Huber: Agnes Bernauer im Spiegel der Quellen, Chronisten, Historiker und Literaten vom 15. bis zum 20. Jahrhundert. Ein Quellen- und Lesebuch. Attenkofer, Straubing 1999, pp. 28–32, especially p. 28.

Secondary sources 

 Marita Panzer: Agnes Bernauer. Die ermordete ‚Herzogin‘. Pustet, Regensburg 2007, pp. 70, 131.
 Helmuth Stahleder: Chronik der Stadt München. Vol. 1, Dölling und Galitz, Ebenhausen 1995, p. 303.

External links 
 Genealogy

1435 births
1435 deaths
House of Wittelsbach
Royalty and nobility who died as children